Shino Mori (森 志乃 Mori Shino, born in Gunma Prefecture 1989) is a Japanese-born ballerina for the National Ballet of Canada.

Career 
Entered Reiko Yamamoto Ballet Company in 1997.
Joined The National Ballet of Canada’s Apprentice programme in 2008.
Became a member of the Corps de Ballet in 2009.
Semi-finalist of Prix de Lausanne (the International dance competition in Lausanne) in 2004.
Won the Scholarship prize of Prix de Lausanne in 2006.

External links 
Reiko Yamamoto Ballet Company
Prix de Lausanne

Japanese ballerinas
People from Gunma Prefecture
1989 births
Living people
Prix de Lausanne winners